Hollywood is the fifth historical novel in Gore Vidal's Narratives of Empire series. Published in 1990, it brings back the fictional Caroline Sanford, Blaise Sanford and James Burden Day and the real Theodore Roosevelt and William Randolph Hearst from Empire (the fourth novel in the series). Events are seen through the eyes of the Sanfords, Day, and the historical Jess Smith, a member of the Ohio Gang.

Historical characters introduced in this novel include Woodrow Wilson, Franklin D. Roosevelt, Eleanor Roosevelt and Warren G. Harding, as well early Hollywood figures such as Charlie Chaplin, Marion Davies, Elinor Glyn, Mabel Normand, and William Desmond Taylor, whose 1922 murder Vidal presents in fictionalized form.

In the novel, Hearst and Caroline separately enter the movie business. Caroline becomes both a producer and, using a pseudonym, also performs as an actress. All this takes place while Wilson enters the United States into World War I and battles over the League of Nations, and Harding's subsequent attempts to return the country to "Normalcy".

Novels by Gore Vidal
Hollywood novels
Novels about film directors and producers
Works about the history of Hollywood, Los Angeles
1990 American novels
Random House books
Fiction set in the 1920s
Cultural depictions of Charlie Chaplin
Cultural depictions of William Randolph Hearst
Cultural depictions of Woodrow Wilson
Cultural depictions of Theodore Roosevelt
Cultural depictions of Franklin D. Roosevelt
Cultural depictions of Eleanor Roosevelt
Cultural depictions of Warren G. Harding
American historical novels